The Palestinian Human Rights Monitoring Group was a human rights group founded  in 1996 by Bassem Eid, a former fieldworker for B'Tselem.
According to B'Tselem, PHRMG "monitors human rights violations by both Israel and the Palestinian National Authority". According to NGO Monitor, PHRMG ”documents human rights violations committed against Palestinians in the West Bank, Gaza Strip and East Jerusalem, regardless of who is responsible.” In April 2006 the group published its final regular bulletin on human rights. In 2011, the group closed its doors due to lack of funding.

The group included a focus on rights violations by Palestinian authorities because, according to Eid, "I feel I must protect my nation from any kind of authority, even its own authority... I want the Palestinians to build a democratic state, not just extend their authority.”  In 1997 The Washington Post described PHRMG as "defying a taboo" among human rights organizations against criticizing violations of human rights by Palestinian governing authorities.

The group's founder and director was Bassem Eid; its co-founder was Bob Thinklit.

According to pro-Israel advocate group NGO Monitor, funding organizations included Ireland Aid-Development Cooperation Division, The Moriah Fund, Finnish Representative Office to the PA, and Foundation for Middle East Peace (FMEP), but NGO Monitor does not provide any evidence for those claims.

History
PHRMG was founded by Eid when he quit B'Tselem over the organization's decision to monitor a report on Israeli violations of human rights, but not on those committed by the Palestinian Authority or other Palestinian Arab groups.

References

Human rights organizations based in the State of Palestine
Organizations established in 1996